The Town of Campo is a Statutory Town located in Baca County, Colorado, United States. The town population was 103 at the 2020 United States Census. The town is situated on the High Plains, straddling U.S. Route 287/385.

History
Campo is a name derived from a Spanish word meaning "field".  A post office called Campo was established in 1913, and the town grew around it.

Geography

Picture Canyon, in the Comanche National Grassland, is to the southwest.  The canyon includes scenic vistas, unique rock formations, rolling hills, and rock art from Plains Indian cultures.

Climate

Demographics

As of the census of 2000, there were 150 people, 55 households, and 44 families residing in the town. The racial makeup of the town was 95.33% White, 3.33% Native American, and 1.33% from two or more races. Hispanic or Latino of any race were 4.67% of the population.

There were 55 households, out of which 40.0% had children under the age of 18 living with them, 70.9% were married couples living together, 5.5% had a female householder with no husband present, and 20.0% were non-families. 18.2% of all households were made up of individuals, and 10.9% had someone living alone who was 65 years of age or older. The average household size was 2.73 and the average family size was 3.11.

In the town, the population was spread out, with 30.7% under the age of 18, 4.7% from 18 to 24, 25.3% from 25 to 44, 22.7% from 45 to 64, and 16.7% who were 65 years of age or older. The median age was 38 years. For every 100 females, there were 105.5 males. For every 100 females age 18 and over, there were 92.6 males.

The median income for a household in the town was $20,875, and the median income for a family was $21,375. Males had a median income of $19,167 versus $19,375 for females. The per capita income for the town was $7,818. There were 33.3% of families and 45.6% of the population living below the poverty line, including 73.2% of under eighteens and 8.3% of those over 64.

Appearances in film 
The town was used as a location for a scene in the 1982 film Savannah Smiles.

See also

Colorado
Bibliography of Colorado
Index of Colorado-related articles
Outline of Colorado
List of counties in Colorado
List of municipalities in Colorado
List of places in Colorado

References

External links

Town of Campo website
CDOT map of the Town of Campo

Towns in Baca County, Colorado
Towns in Colorado